"Every Girl" is a song by New Zealand band Stellar*, released as the fifth and final single from their debut album, Mix (1999). It is the band's highest-charting single in their home country, reaching number three on the RIANZ Singles Chart. The single was also released in Australia several months later with a different cover artwork. Track two of the single is billed as "Stellar vs International Observer" and is a dub remix of the band's "Violent" single. The second B-side is a dance remix of "Every Girl" called "Smooth Girl", done by band member Andrew Maclaren.

Background
According to band member Chris Van de Geer, "Every Girl" was recorded after Stellar* finished touring with fellow New Zealand band the Feelers in April 1999, becoming one the last tracks recorded for Mix.

Track listing
New Zealand and Australian CD single
 "Every Girl"
 "Pretty Violent Dub Riotous Sound System Clash"
 "Smooth Girl"

Credits and personnel
Credits are lifted from the Stellar* website.

Studios
 Recorded at Revolver (Auckland, New Zealand)
 Mixed at Airforce (Auckland, New Zealand)
 Mastered at York Street (Auckland, New Zealand)

Personnel

 Boh Runga – writing
 Tom Bailey – production
 Stellar* – production
 Luke Tomes – programming, mixing, engineering
 Andrew Maclaren – programming
 Glen Cleaver – assistant engineering
 Justin Pemberton – video directing
 Gavin Botica – mastering

Charts

Weekly charts

Year-end charts

References

2000 singles
2000 songs
Epic Records singles
Songs written by Boh Runga
Stellar (New Zealand band) songs